John Head (30 June 1783 – 3 March 1862) was an Anglican priest in Ireland in the nineteenth century.

Notes

1783 births
1862 deaths
Alumni of Trinity College Dublin
Deans of Killaloe
19th-century Irish Anglican priests
People from County Tipperary